Aleksandr Baldin (born August 31, 1984) is an Estonian former swimmer, who specialized in breaststroke events. He is a 15-time long-course Estonian swimming champion in the breaststroke (50, 100, and 200), and a member of SK Garant in Tallinn, under the tutelage of his personal coach Dmitri Kapelin. Baldin also represented his nation Estonia in a breaststroke double at the 2004 Summer Olympics.

Baldin qualified for two swimming events at the 2004 Summer Olympics in Athens, by eclipsing FINA B-standard entry times of 1:04.50 (100 m breaststroke) and 2:16.73 (200 m breaststroke) from the Russian Championships in Moscow. In the 100 m breaststroke, Baldin raced to seventh place and forty-ninth overall on the third heat by half a second (0.50) behind Cyprus' Kyriakos Dimosthenous in 1:06.04. In the 200 m breaststroke, Baldin challenged seven other swimmers on the same heat, including Olympic veterans Ratapong Sirisanont of Thailand and Daniel Málek of the Czech Republic. Baldin took a sixth spot in his heat by 0.43 of a second behind Malek in 2:17.90. Baldin failed to advance into the semifinals, as he placed thirty-second overall in the preliminaries.

References

External links
 
 
 

1984 births
Living people
Estonian male breaststroke swimmers
Olympic swimmers of Estonia
Swimmers at the 2004 Summer Olympics
Swimmers from Tallinn
Estonian people of Russian descent
21st-century Estonian people